The Trans-Tasman Cup was an association football competition played between Australia and New Zealand. Six editions were played between 1983 and 1995 after the OFC Nations Cup was discontinued. It was considered the most important Oceanian tournament during the absence of the OFC Nations Cup. The tournament was won four times by Australia and twice by New Zealand. The 1995 edition doubled as a semifinal for the 1996 OFC Nations Cup.

Format
The Cup was played over two legs, one in Australia and one in New Zealand.

Past tournaments/winners

1983

|}

1986

|}

1987

|}

1988

|}

1991

|}

1995

|}

See also

Australia–New Zealand association football rivalry
Soccer Ashes

External links
Trans-Tasman Cup on RSSSF Archive

Australia national soccer team
New Zealand national football team
International association football competitions hosted by New Zealand
International association football competitions hosted by Australia
Defunct international association football competitions in Oceania
Sports rivalries in Australia
Sports rivalries in New Zealand
Recurring sporting events established in 1983
Recurring sporting events disestablished in 1995